RWC is a common abbreviation for the term Rugby World Cup, gender neutral name for the Men's Rugby World Cup and Women’s Rugby World Cup, both quadrennial international rugby union competitions.

RWC may also refer to:

 Rawcliffe railway station, East Riding of Yorkshire; National Rail station code RWC
 Rear Window Captioning System
 Redwood City, California
Reliance Worldwide Corporation, an ASX-listed company in the industrials sector
 Rexdale Women's Centre, supports high-need women in Toronto
 Rideal-Walker coefficient, a figure expressing the disinfecting power of a substance
 Rich web client, a software application that is rich in features and executed inside a web browser
 Roberts Wesleyan College, a liberal arts college in North Chili, New York
 Russian Weapons Company, formed in 2011, the sole United States distributor of Russian manufactured Kalashnikov weapons